Syzygium is a genus of flowering plants that belongs to the myrtle family, Myrtaceae. The genus comprises about 1200 species, and has a native range that extends from Africa and Madagascar through southern Asia east through the Pacific. Its highest levels of diversity occur from Malaysia to northeastern Australia, where many species are very poorly known and many more have not been described taxonomically.

Most species are evergreen trees and shrubs. Several species are grown as ornamental plants for their attractive glossy foliage, and a few produce edible fruits called roseapples that are eaten fresh or used in jams and jellies. The most economically important species, however, is the clove Syzygium aromaticum, of which the unopened flower buds are an important spice. Some of the edible species of Syzygium are planted throughout the tropics worldwide, and several have become invasive species in some island ecosystems. Fifty-two species are found in Australia and are generally known as lillipillies, brush cherries or satinash.

At times Syzygium was confused taxonomically with the genus Eugenia (c. 1000 species), but the latter genus has its highest specific diversity in the neotropics. Many species formerly classed as Eugenia are now included in the genus Syzygium, although the former name may persist in horticulture. The Syzygium Working Group, an international group of researchers, formed in April 2016 with the aim to produce a monograph of Syzygium.

Species

Selected species include:

Returned to this genus
Cleistocalyx operculatus has recently been returned to this genus, becoming a synonym for Syzygium nervosum

References

Further reading

External links

 CRFG.org 
 Unimelb.edu.au

 
Garden plants of Australia
Myrtales of Australia
Trees of Australia